Donau-Auen National Park covers 93 square kilometres in Vienna and Lower Austria and is one of the largest remaining floodplains of the Danube in Middle Europe.

The German word Aue (variant Au) means "river island,  wetland, floodplain, riparian woodland", i.e. a cultivated landscape in a  riparian zone. The words Aue and Au occur in a large number of German place names—including Donau, the German word for the Danube River—and refer to forests, meadows, and wetlands in river and stream lowlands and floodplains.  The Danube-Auen National Park protects a large area of lowland forests, meadows, wetlands, and other riparian habitat along the Danube just downstream of Vienna.

The Park was designated an IUCN category II national park and spans the areas of Vienna (Lobau), Groß-Enzersdorf, Orth an der Donau, Eckartsau, Engelhartstetten, Hainburg, Bad Deutsch-Altenburg, Petronell-Carnuntum, Regelsbrunn, Haslau-Maria Ellend, Fischamend and Schwechat.

Creation of the National Park

Until the 19th century the Danube was an untamed river. In the 19th century, extensive engineering began to alter the natural balance of the river landscape dramatically. Many side-channels were dammed so that they now carry water from the Danube only at flood stages. Ever more intrusive engineering interventions were accompanied by decades of heavy forestry use in many parts of lowland forests. In the 1950s, development began of a nearly unbroken chain of hydroelectric power plants and associated dams on the Austrian section of the Danube River.

In 1984, the planned construction of the Hainburg hydroelectric power plant, just downstream from Vienna, threatened to destry one of two remaining free-flowing sections of the Danube in Austria and its riparian forests (the other remaining free-flowing section in Austria is upstream, near Wachau). An outcry by environmental and nature protection groups caused nationwide protests against the project. The operator of the power plant project disregarded the protests and began work to clear the area. Protests stepped up, eventually leading to the occupation of the Hainburg wetlands by thousands of people from all ages and professions (the so-called "Hainburg Movement"). After police tried several times to clear protestors from the area, in December 1984 the Federal Government declared a pause for reflection. In January 1985 the Austrian Supreme Court forbad further deforestation. In March 1985, the so-called Konrad Lorenz-Volksbegehren (petition), signed by 353,906 people, demanded the prohibition of large power plants such as Hainburg and the establishment of a national park in the area of Hainburg. On 1 July 1986, the Administrative Court released a decision cancelling the water rights of the planned power plant.

Extensive scientific studies were then made of the area, with surprising discoveries. More species of fish were observed than was known at the time the planning of the power plant.

The most important result of these studies was that the Danube lowlands area (Donau-Auen) in and east of Vienna was determined to be worthy of becoming a national park. It was also determined that creating a power plant in the area would not be compatible with national park status for the region. On October 27, 1996, a State Treaty between the Republic of Austria and the federal states of Vienna and Lower Austria was signed. With that treaty, Donau-Auen National Park was officially opened.

Flora and fauna
In the National Park area there are more than 700 species of higher plants, more than 30 mammals, 100 species of breeding birds, 8 reptiles, 13 amphibian species, and around 50 species of fish. Among the most characteristic inhabitants of the wetlands of the National Park are the Danube crested newt, European pond turtle, European mudminnow, white-tailed eagle, Eurasian kingfisher, and Eurasian beaver.

With the variety of insects living on both land and water, and other invertebrates, the total number of species in Donau-Auen National Park is estimated to be at least 5,000.

The River 

The main channel of the Danube was separated from its side channels by the flood control measures that were constructed around the year 1900. The outcome was a higher current velocity in the main channel, with a resulting deepening of the river bed, while in the side channels—which no longer had current flowing through them—sand and loam deposits were no longer removed by the current. In a natural riparian ecosystem woody plants and deadwood have a strong impact on the natural flow dynamics, by stabilizing riverbanks, by reducing erosion, and by creating areas of reducing or increased flow rates, and thus affecting in which areas sediments are deposited or removed. Large tree trunks and accumulations of smaller flotsam cause the water to stagnate and the speed of the current to drop, leading to increased sedimentation.

To counteract the effects of the flood control measures, beginning in 2002 individual side channels were tied in with the main channel again—at least at high water times—via Gewässervernetzungen ("water crossings"), which lower or remove the levees protecting those channels.

In a 2006 pilot project created with the support of the LIFE+ Program of the European Union and the Austrian riverways agency via donau, about three kilometers of the complete flood works were removed across the river from Hainburg, so that the river once again could spread into the floodplain areas. In a similar project near Witzelsdorf, about one kilometer of the levees were removed.  After the completion of the pilot projects in Hainburg and Witzelsdorf, future plans for this river engineering project are for removal of 50% of the levees and flood control works between Vienna and the eastern border of Austria.

Aside from a revitalization of the Au (riparian zone), the project promises to mediate the effects of floods on the river and to stabilize the riverbed to the benefit of both river ecology and navigation.

Photo gallery

External links 

 www.donauauen.at 
  Wikipedia commons photo gallery
 Infothek - Dateien und Medien rund um den Nationalpark Donau-Auen zum Download
 Juniorranger - Website für Jugendliche, die im Nationalpark mithelfen wollen
 Camps - Website über das Camp-Angebot der Nationalpark Donau-Auen für Kinder, Familien, Vereine und Schulklassen
 Blog - Aktuelles rund um den Nationalpark Donau-Auen
 Donau-Auen (Lobau) - Erholungsgebiet in Wien (Webservice der Stadt Wien)
 Life Natur Projekte in Nationalpark Donau Auen (Life Nature Projects in Donau Auen National Park, in German)

National parks of Austria
Protected areas established in 1996
Gänserndorf District
Donaustadt
Schwechat
Bruck an der Leitha District
Parks in Vienna
Geography of Lower Austria
Tourist attractions in Lower Austria